Love is a 2005 independent feature film, written, directed and edited by Vladan Nikolic, produced by Jim Stark (Down by Law, Night on Earth, Factotum) and executive produced by Christoph Thoke (Tropical Malady).  The film was made in New York City for $350,000, with a cast and crew from over 20 countries, with 168 scenes, shot at over 60 locations. The film was shot on mini DV in 20 days, transferred to 35mm film, and received high praise in the September 2005 issue of American Cinematographer for its stylish look.

It impressed audiences and critics at the 2005 Tribeca Film Festival, Venice Film Festival, and the Oldenburg Film Festival.  Love also won the Prix De Jeunes at the Cinéma Tout Ecran festival in Geneva, Switzerland. Critics compared the film to Pulp Fiction, Memento, Rashomon, and in its political subtext to Marathon Man and Dirty Pretty Things (Variety).

Told through a non-linear narrative from each of the characters' points of view, the film reconstructs the stories of a Yugoslav hit man (Sergej Trifunovic), his former lover (Geno Lechner), and her police officer boyfriend (Peter Gevisser), as their paths cross in New York.

References

External links

 
Official website
Love at the 2nd edition of Venice Days (62nd Venice International Film Festival)

2005 drama films
2005 films
American drama films
Films shot in New York City
American independent films
2000s English-language films
2000s American films